SM U-108 was a submarine in the Imperial German Navy in World War I, taking part in the First Battle of the Atlantic.

Construction
The building contract was confirmed 5 May 1916, and was awarded to Germaniawerft, Kiel. A Type 93 boat, she was launched 11 October 1917 and commissioned 5 December. She was under the command of Korvettenkapitän Martin Nitzsche.

Design
German Type U 93 submarines were preceded by the shorter Type U 87 submarines. U-108 had a displacement of  when at the surface and  while submerged. The submarine was powered by two  engines for use while surfaced, and two  engines for use while submerged. She had two propeller shafts and two  propellers.

U-108 was fitted with six  torpedo tubes (four at the bow and two at the stern), twelve to sixteen torpedoes, one  SK L/45 deck gun, and one  SK L/30 deck gun. She had a complement of thirty-six (thirty-two crew members and four officers).

Fate
On 20 November 1918, U-108 was surrendered to France where she was commissioned as Léon Mignot and served until 24 July 1935.

Summary of raiding history

References

Notes

Citations

Bibliography

World War I submarines of Germany
German Type U 93 submarines
Ships built in Kiel
1917 ships
U-boats commissioned in 1917
Shipwrecks in the English Channel
U-boats sunk in 1918
Ships lost with all hands